"Lost in You" is a song by German recording artist Lena Meyer-Landrut. It was released on 14 April 2017 as a single. The song was written by Meyer-Landrut, Vincent Stein, Konstantin Scherer, Wim Treuner and Nico Wellenbrink.

Track listing

Charts

Release history

References

2017 songs
2017 singles
Lena Meyer-Landrut songs
Universal Music Group singles
Songs written by Vincent Stein
Songs written by Nico Santos (singer)
Songs written by Lena Meyer-Landrut